Vlastimil Ryška (born 1 April 1982) is a retired Czech football defender.

References

1982 births
Living people
Czech footballers
FK Teplice players
Association football defenders
Czech First League players
Sportspeople from Ústí nad Labem